Sakhteman-e Mansur (also Romanized as Sākhtemān-e Manşūr) is a village in Mishan Rural District, Mahvarmilani District, Mamasani County, Fars Province, Iran. At the 2006 census, its population was 53, in 11 families.

References 

Populated places in Mamasani County